Peaches (also known as "Girl with the Peach Tattoo" or as Jane Doe No. 3) is an unidentified female whose torso was discovered on June 28, 1997, in Lakeview, New York, near Hempstead Lake State Park. The cause of the woman's death is listed as homicide, apparently by decapitation. , she remains unidentified since her skull has yet to be found. The woman had a tattoo on her left breast depicting a heart-shaped peach with a bite taken out of it and two drops falling from its core, which resulted in her nickname.
, additional skeletal remains found on Long Island in 2011 have been positively identified as belonging to Peaches, along with the remains of her child. As a result, Peaches is now linked to the Long Island serial killer as a potential victim.

Case history
On June 28, 1997, a dismembered body was discovered by a hiker in a wooded area of Hempstead Lake State Park, Lakeview, New York. The head, both arms, and both legs (below the knee) were severed and have yet to be found. The torso was found on the west side of Lake Drive, about 200 yards north of Peninsula Boulevard right by the McDonald Pond. She was found in a Rubbermaid container along with a red towel and a floral pillowcase. With no leads to the woman's identity, the police published a picture of the approximately two-inch-wide tattoo in a national tattoo magazine, in the hopes of finding the artist who did the work. They received a call from Steve Cullen, a tattoo artist in Connecticut who claimed he remembered giving the tattoo to a woman. Cullen said he remembered the customer as a young black woman, about 18 or 19 years old, who was accompanied by two women, an aunt and a cousin. During the session, he also claimed she told him she was from either the Bronx or Long Island and that she was in Connecticut because she was having trouble with her boyfriend at the time. It is possible the woman had other tattoos on her arms or lower legs that the killer did not want found.

On December 13, 2016, Long Island Press reported that local authorities had positively identified skeletal remains (formerly referred to as "Jane Doe 3") found at Jones Beach State Park in 2011 as belonging to Peaches. Remains of a child were also found in 2011, east of Cedar Beach, with DNA testing identifying Jane Doe 3—or "Peaches"—as its mother. As a result of these findings, Peaches has now been linked to the Long Island serial killer as a potential early victim.

Investigation 
On October 8, 2022, the Mobile Police Department announced on its official Facebook page that the FBI was seeking relatives and friends of Elijah "Lige" Howell/Howard (1927-1963). Howard lived in Prichard, Alabama with his wife Carrie and passed away in Mobile, Alabama in 1963 while living with a Ms. Lillie Mae Wiggins Packer. The FBI believes his relatives may be able to assist in identifying Peaches and her child. A woman on her Facebook page simultaneously announced that the FBI reached out to her for a DNA test. The test revealed that she and Peaches were fourth cousins. An examination of the Howard family tree has indicated that Peaches might be the granddaughter of Sidney Howell Junior and Iouanna Carter, the parents of Elijah Howell/Howard.

Related cases

"Cherries"

On March 3, 2007, a dismembered torso was found in a suitcase in Harbor Island Park in Mamaroneck, Westchester County, New York. Investigators believe the victim was a heavy-set Hispanic or Light-skinned African-American woman, about five feet seven inches tall, and 180 to 200 pounds. She had a tattoo of two red cherries on a green stem located on her right breast. "Cherries" (as she is referred to by law enforcement) was also decapitated and dismembered, although her original cause of death was a stab wound to the torso. Unlike Peaches, investigators found both of Cherries' legs, which washed up on the shore of Cablevision owner James Dolan's beachfront estate in Oyster Bay, New York. Inside the suitcase investigators found a pair of gray Champion sweat pants, a tan or cream-colored long-sleeved shirt by Voice and a red camisole bearing Spanish-language labels. The dark blue or black suitcase is sold exclusively at WalMart stores. Police also found small scraps of paper tucked away in the crevices of the suitcase. When pieced together, it looks like a calendar with the Spanish word "cinco" and the phrase "begin to live." Police claim that since the torso floated onto the beach as storm-fed floods hit the region, it could have originated from almost anywhere.

See also
List of unsolved murders
Long Island serial killer

References

External links

1997 deaths
1997 in New York (state)
1997 murders in the United States
20th-century births
20th-century women
2007 deaths
Deaths by decapitation
Deaths by stabbing in the United States
Dismemberments
Female murder victims
History of women in New York (state)
Incidents of violence against women
Murdered African-American people
Murdered American children
People murdered in New York (state)
Unidentified American children
Unidentified murder victims in New York (state)
Unsolved murders in the United States
Violence against women in the United States